Repulsion may refer to:

 Disgust, or repulsion, an emotional response to something considered offensive or unpleasant
 Repulsion, a type of genetic linkage
 Repulsion in physics, Coulomb's law
 Repulsion in diamagnetism, which pushes two bodies away from each other
 Repulsion theory, in botany

In the arts:
 Repulsion (band), a grindcore band
 Repulsion (film), a 1965 horror  film directed by Roman Polański
 "Repulsion", a 1985 song by Dinosaur Jr

See also
 Repulse (disambiguation)
 Repulsive force (disambiguation)